Cavin Odongo (born 20 October 1996) is a Kenyan international footballer who plays for Kariobangi Sharks, as a striker.

Career
Odongo has played club football for Kitengela Shooters, Posta Rangers and Kariobangi Sharks.

He made his international debut for Kenya in 2016.

References

1996 births
Living people
Kenyan footballers
Kenya international footballers
Posta Rangers F.C. players
F.C. Kariobangi Sharks players
Kenyan Premier League players
Association football forwards